The Kotra is a  river in Belarus and Lithuania. The river is an example of a rare phenomenon of river bifurcation.

At first, the Kotra and Ūla form one river, known as the Pelesa, which originates in Belarus and flows in a northwestern direction. This situation arose in the second half of the 19th century when the Ūla, due to its channel erosion, crossed the water divide between its own and the Kotra's drainage basins. These processes also caused a decrease in groundwater levels and the almost total disappearance of several lakes in the area.

The Kotra and its surrounding marshes form wetlands of international importance: Kotra Ramsar site and Cepkeliai Ramsar site</ref> Varėna district municipality established a  reservoir to protect the natural Kotra environment.

References

 
 
 "Cepkeliai". Long Term Ecological Research (LTER) Network in Lithuania. Institute of Ecology of Vilnius University. Accessed 9 October 2006.

External links
Information Sheet on Ramsar Wetlands (PDF)
Environmental Changes in the Ūla and Katra Upper Reaches During the Last 14,000 Years (PDF)
Čepkeliai Marsh and Kotra River

Rivers of Grodno Region
Rivers of Lithuania
International rivers of Europe
Belarus–Lithuania border
Ramsar sites in Belarus
Rivers of Belarus